Three of the four New Hampshire incumbents were re-elected.

Under New Hampshire law a majority of voters (12.5% of votes) was required for election. Only three candidates achieved a majority, and so a run-off election was held for the fourth seat.

See also 
 List of United States representatives from New Hampshire
 United States House of Representatives elections, 1794 and 1795

1794
New Hampshire
United States House of Representatives